Daikan has various meanings:

Daikan (代官) was a magistrate in Japanese history; see for example Daikansho.
 is the Japanese word for Dahan (solar term), the coldest part of the year.
 Daikan (album)